Tanvir Islam (born 25 October 1996) is a Bangladeshi cricketer. He made his List A debut for Khelaghar Samaj Kallyan Samity in the 2016–17 Dhaka Premier Division Cricket League on 21 April 2017. He made his first-class debut for Barisal Division in the 2017–18 National Cricket League on 15 September 2017. He made his Twenty20 debut for Khulna Titans on 24 November 2017 in the 2017–18 Bangladesh Premier League.

He was the leading wicket-taker for Khelaghar Samaj Kallyan Samity in the 2017–18 Dhaka Premier Division Cricket League, with 22 dismissals in 16 matches.

In October 2018, he was named in the squad for the Khulna Titans team, following the draft for the 2018–19 Bangladesh Premier League. In December 2018, he was named in Bangladesh's team for the 2018 ACC Emerging Teams Asia Cup. In November 2019, he was named in Bangladesh's squad for the 2019 ACC Emerging Teams Asia Cup in Bangladesh. Later the same month, he was selected to play for the Khulna Tigers in the 2019–20 Bangladesh Premier League, and he was named in Bangladesh's squad for the men's cricket tournament at the 2019 South Asian Games. The Bangladesh team won the gold medal, after they beat Sri Lanka by seven wickets in the final.

In February 2021, he was selected in the Bangladesh Emerging squad for their home series against the Ireland Wolves. In the unofficial Test match, Islam took thirteen wickets in the match, including 8/51 in the second innings.

International career
In March 2023, he named as Twenty20 International (T20I) squad for their series against England. He made his T20I debut in the third T20I of the series, on 14 March 2023.

References

External links
 

1996 births
Living people
Bangladeshi cricketers
Barisal Division cricketers
Khelaghar Samaj Kallyan Samity cricketers
Khulna Tigers cricketers
People from Barisal
South Asian Games gold medalists for Bangladesh
South Asian Games medalists in cricket
Bangladesh Twenty20 International cricketers
Comilla Victorians cricketers